Gizavesh is a village in the Elbasan County, eastern Albania. Following the local government reform of 2015, Gizavesh became a part of the municipality of Librazhd and is under the municipal unit of Qendër Librazhd.

Demographic History
Gizavesh (Kinazhavic) is attested in the Ottoman defter of 1467 as a settlement in the vilayet of Çermeniça. The village had a total of seven households represented by the following household heads: Pop Nikolla, Petri Mançi (possibly, Maneci), Çiro Batishi, Mihal Kalevari, Gjon Filoku (possibly, Floku), Nikollë Derazi, and Miho Prifti.

References

Villages in Elbasan County
Populated places in Librazhd